

Sponsorship

Club

Staffs
U Soe Min – Manager
U Kyi Lwin – Head Coach
U Zaw Min Tun – Assistant Coach
U Chit Naing – Assiant Coach
U Maung Maung Htay – Assistant Coach
U Myo Kyaw Thu – GK Coach
U Paw Tun Kayw – Assistant Coach
U Nyi Nyi Kayw Myint – Media Officer
.U Aung Myo Lwin – secretary
U Tin Aung Moe- Nurse

Other information

|-

2016 First team squad

Transfers

In:

Out:

References

External links
 First Eleven Journal in Burmese
 Magway FC

Magway